Robert Wayne Thomas (born October 9, 1947) is a Canadian former professional ice hockey goaltender who played in the National Hockey League (NHL) for the Montreal Canadiens, Toronto Maple Leafs, and New York Rangers between 1972 and 1981. He also held several positions in coaching and management in the NHL and the minor leagues, including 22 years in management with the San Jose Sharks.

Playing career
Thomas played junior hockey from 1963 to 1967 with the Ottawa Capitals of the Central Canada Hockey League (CCHL), and was the league's top goaltender in 1965–66. Thomas then played three years of varsity hockey at the University of Wisconsin under coach Bob Johnson. Thomas recorded a shutout in his first game with Wisconsin in 1968, an 11–0 victory against Pennsylvania. He was with the team in its first appearance in the Frozen Four tournament in Lake Placid, New York in 1970. Thomas ranks in the top 10 all-time for Wisconsin goaltenders in save percentage (.909 – 9th all-time) and goals against average (2.84 – 10th all-time) as of the 2019–20 season.

Thomas's National Hockey League rights were originally held by the Toronto Maple Leafs, who traded him to the Los Angeles Kings in 1968, and who in turn traded him to the Montreal Canadiens in 1970.

Thomas played two seasons with the Montreal and Nova Scotia Voyageurs, the American Hockey League (AHL) affiliate of the Montreal Canadiens. With the Voyageurs he won the Calder Cup, the AHL championship trophy, in 1972. The following year, he became the tenth goalie to record a shutout in his NHL debut, with a 3–0 Canadiens victory against the Vancouver Canucks. He won his first seven consecutive home starts, and overall recorded an 8–1 regular season record, but did not play in the playoffs; Thomas was the number 3 goalie behind Ken Dryden and Michel Plasse. In 1973–74, with Dryden sitting out the season to complete his bar exam, he shared duties with Plasse and Michel Larocque, playing 42 games and sporting a 2.76 goals against average, but again was not used in the playoffs. On March 10, 1974, Thomas set a Canadiens record with 53 saves in a 5–4 victory against the Pittsburgh Penguins; the record has since been tied by Carey Price. Thomas's goals against was the fourth-best average in the NHL, and was Montreal's winner of that year's Molson Cup. He then spent the entire 1974–75 season as Montreal's number 3 goalie, but did not see action in a single game as Dryden returned with Larocque as his backup. Thomas was frustrated, but appeased when Montreal general manager Sam Pollock advised him that the team intended to not utilize him but would trade him to a "good situation" in the off season.

After three seasons in Montreal he was traded to the Toronto Maple Leafs in June 1975 for a first-round draft pick. He played in the 1976 All Star game and recorded the win. After two years in Toronto, he became expendable upon the emergence of Mike Palmateer, and the New York Rangers acquired him in 1977 on waivers, to use him as the backup to John Davidson. When Davidson got injured, Thomas took over as the starter, playing in 41 games that season. Thomas played four seasons with the Rangers and retired in 1981.

Coaching and management career
After retiring as a player, he was hired by the New York Rangers as a goaltending coach, one of the first in professional hockey. By January 1981, Thomas was third on the Rangers' goalie depth chart behind John Davidson and Doug Soetaert, and was seen by coach and general manager Craig Patrick to be more useful to the team as a coach; Thomas was announced to be coaching the team's goalies on January 28. He remained in that position until the end of the 1984–85 season.

In 1985 Thomas became the head coach of the Salt Lake Golden Eagles of the International Hockey League (IHL), a Rangers affiliate. In his second year in Salt Lake City, the Golden Eagles won the Turner Cup and Thomas was awarded the Commissioner's Trophy as the IHL's Coach of the Year.

In 1986, he returned to the NHL as assistant coach of the Chicago Blackhawks, a hiring based in part on his work with goalies such as Mike Vernon with the Golden Eagles, and Glen Hanlon and John Vanbiesbrouck with the Rangers. Under head coach Bob Murdoch, Thomas focused on Chicago's goalies and was involved in the development of Jimmy Waite and Ed Belfour. During the 1989–90 season, Thomas served as head coach of the St. Louis Blues' IHL affiliate, the Peoria Rivermen. In January 1990, the Blues temporarily brought him to St. Louis as a de facto goaltender coach to consult on the development of Blues prospects Vincent Riendeau and Curtis Joseph. That summer Thomas was officially named a Blues assistant coach, with specialty in goaltending, and was specifically hired by head coach Brian Sutter for his experience. Thomas stayed on as an assistant coach in 1992 when St. Louis replaced Sutter with Bob Plager.

In 1993, Thomas left the Blues to join the San Jose Sharks as assistant to the general manager and assistant coach. He remained in that role until the 1995–1996 season, when he was named assistant general manager. He was named vice president of the Sharks in 2001. He remained vice president and assistant general manager until his retirement in 2015.

Personal life
Thomas has a bachelor's degree in physical education from the University of Wisconsin. He and his wife, Barb, have two daughters, Gretchen and Abby, and three grandchildren, Erik, Elsje, and Harrison.

Career statistics

Regular season and playoffs

Awards and honors

References

External links
 

1947 births
Living people
Canadian ice hockey coaches
Canadian ice hockey goaltenders
Chicago Blackhawks coaches
Ice hockey people from Ottawa
Montreal Canadiens players
Montreal Voyageurs players
New Haven Nighthawks players
New York Rangers coaches
New York Rangers players
Nova Scotia Voyageurs players
St. Louis Blues coaches
San Jose Sharks coaches
San Jose Sharks executives
Stanley Cup champions
Toronto Maple Leafs players
Wisconsin Badgers men's ice hockey players